Vexillum houarti is a species of sea snail, a marine gastropod mollusk, in the family Costellariidae, the ribbed miters.

Distribution
This species occurs in Vietnam.

References

houarti
Gastropods described in 2016